The Gulf of Boothia  is a body of water in Nunavut, Canada. Administratively it is divided between the Kitikmeot Region on the west and the Qikiqtaaluk Region on the east. It merges north into Prince Regent Inlet, the two forming a single bay with different names for its parts. It is surrounded by, clockwise, Baffin Island, Fury and Hecla Strait, the Melville Peninsula, the Canadian mainland, and the Boothia Peninsula. The south end is Committee Bay, northwest of which are the Simpson Peninsula and Pelly Bay. 

In 1822, it was seen by some of William Edward Parry's men, who went on foot along the ice-choked Fury and Hecla Strait. In 1829, it was entered by John Ross, who was frozen in for four years and named it for his patron Sir Felix Booth. Its south end was explored by John Rae in 1846–1847, who reached it overland from the south.

Further reading

 Barber, D. G., and J. Iacozza. 2004. "Historical Analysis of Sea Ice Conditions in M'Clintock Channel and the Gulf of Boothia, Nunavut: Implications for Ringed Seal and Polar Bear Habitat". Arctic. 57: 1-14. 
 Collin, A. E. An Oceanographic Study of Prince Regent Inlet, the Gulf of Boothia and Adjacent Waters. [S.l.]: Atlantic Oceanographic Group, 1958. 
 Markham, Albert Hastings, and Sherard Osborn. A Whaling Cruise to Baffin's Bay and the Gulf of Boothia. And an Account of the Rescue of the Crew of the "Polaris.". London: S. Low, Marston, Low, and Searle, 1875. 

Boothia, Gulf of
Boothia, Gulf of
Bodies of water of Baffin Island